Kavundampalayam is a village in the Erode district of Tamil Nadu, South India. The village belongs to Chennimalai panchayat town.

Access
Kavundampalayam can be reached by bus from Chennimalai town (Bus No. C4). Kavundampalayam is just 10 km outer from Chennimalai and just 9 km away from Salem to Coimbatore National Highway (NH 47). It is located near railway track between the railway stations Ingoor and Vijayamangalam. All trains from Erode to Coimbatore goes by this route only.

Demographics
As of 2001 India census, Kavundampalayam had a population of 125. Males constitute 51% of the population and females 49%. Kavundampalayam has an average literacy rate of 20%, much lower than the national average of 59.5%, with male literacy of 40% and female literacy of 60%. 10% of the population is under 6 years of age.

Climate
The climate in general is dry and characterised by scanty rainfall. The maximum rainfall is recorded in Gobichettipalayam and Bhavani taluks. Unlike the health-aiding climate of nearby Coimbatore district, Kavundampalayam has dry weather throughout the year except during the monsoons. The Palghat Gap in the Western Ghats, which has a moderating effect on the climate of Coimbatore district, does not render much help in bringing down the dry climate in the area. The cool moist wind that gushes out of the west coast through the Palghat gap loses its coolness and becomes dry by the time it crosses Coimbatore district and reaches Kavundampalayam.

Generally the first two months of the year are pleasant, but in March the temperature begins to rise, which persists till the end of May. The highest temperatures are normally recorded during May. The scanty showers during this period do not provide much relief from the oppressive heat, however there is a slight improvement in the climate during the June–August period. During the pre-monsoon period, the temperature reverses its trend. By September the sky gets heavily overcast, although the rains are meagre. The northeast monsoon sets in vigorously only during October–November, and by December the rains disappear, rendering the climate clear but pleasant.

Economy
Kavundampalayam is well known for handloom, powerloom textile products and ready-made garments. Products such as cotton sarees, bed spreads, carpets, lungies, printed fabrics, towels, dhotis are marketed here in bulk. These products are exported to other states and countries. In Kavundampalayam 75% of people own looms.

Temples
Annamar Temple
Ayyavu Temple
Kannimar Temple
Pattanathu Ayyan Temple

References

Villages in Erode district